Fox Sports Maine was a network of sports/talk stations owned by Blueberry Broadcasting carrying Fox Sports Radio. Located in Central Maine, it comprised WFAU (1280 AM) in Gardiner, Maine, WVOM (1450 AM) in Rockland, Maine, and WIGY (97.5 FM) in Madison, Maine. Its studios were located in Augusta, Maine. The network also carried some CBS Sports Radio programming.

Former programming
Fox Sports Radio

CBS Sports Radio

Imus in the Morning

Boston Red Sox Baseball (Part of the Red Sox Radio Network)

Westwood One NFL football

The Jim Rome Show

Boston Celtics Basketball

ACC Basketball

Select games of the Maine Black Bears

What's Brewin' Afternoon sports talk show, carried from October 2006-March 2007

MLB on ESPN Radio

Portland Sea Dogs Baseball

History

Previous to its sports trimulcast. 97.5 WQSK (then WIGY) and 1280 WFAU simulcasted the (then) sports format of WSKW and WHQO (now WFMX).
WQSK also simulcasted WGUY Dexter, Maine and WKCG in the 1990s. WFAU was an Adult Standards format and WRKD (now WVOM) was a talk station carrying Rush Limbaugh, however for a time they were affiliated with ESPN Radio. The station also has carried New York Giants football, but elected to carry Westwood One's football coverage for the 2007 NFL season.They also broadcast High School Sports for years, utilizing talent such as Don Brown, Rob Kennedy, and Matt Boutwell.

End of simulcast
In the summer of 2013 owner Blueberry Broadcasting dismantled the network, selling off WFAU (which became WJYE in 2014 and WHTP in 2020), switching WRKD (by then known as WVOM) to a simulcast of WVOM-FM/WVQM and WIGY (which would change call letters to WQSK) to a simulcast of WQSS/WKSQ.

Sports radio in the United States
Mass media in Kennebec County, Maine
Knox County, Maine
Radio stations disestablished in 2013
2013 disestablishments in Maine
Sports in Augusta, Maine
Defunct radio networks in the United States
Defunct mass media in Maine
Defunct radio stations in the United States